is a Japanese Tokusatsu television show. It is the fifth entry in the Kamen Rider Series, the show was broadcast on TBS and MBS from April 5, 1975 to December 27, 1975. Stronger is a co-production between Ishinomori Productions and Toei, and was created by Shōtarō Ishinomori.

It is the first Kamen Rider entry to introduce to the audience a form changing ability, which becomes primarily used in Kamen Rider Black RX, and the future Kamen Rider TV series entries, such as Kamen Rider Kuuga onward.

Story
Following the death of his close friend and mentor , Shigeru Jo joins the evil organization Black Satan. With the promise of great power, and fueled by a desire for revenge, Shigeru undergoes surgery to become one of Black Satan's super soldiers. Secretly, Shigeru knows that Black Satan was responsible for Numata's murder, and he uses the organization as a means to gain the power he needs to exact his vengeance. The newly transformed Shigeru escapes from the Black Satan headquarters before they can brainwash him, and becomes Kamen Rider Stronger. Shortly after his escape, Stronger meets Yuriko Misaki, another cyborg soldier created by Black Satan who can transform into Electro-Wave Human Tackle. Together they combat Black Satan and later the Delza Army, to restore peace in Japan. During a battle against the Delza Army, Tackle sacrifices herself to protect Stronger, and Stronger performs a special procedure on himself to achieve his "Charge-Up Form". Later, the six previous Kamen Riders return to Japan and join Stronger to finally topple the evil Delza Army.

Characters
  is the protagonist and eponymous character of the series. When he transforms into his rider form, he shouts "Henshin... Stronger!". In episode 31, he gains the ability to power up into a new "Charge Up" form after undergoing surgery. However, he has to use this power up in less than a minute or else he'll explode.
  is the first attempt at a female Kamen Rider. She was to be used by Black Satan like Shigeru but was by him while he was trying to find a way out of Black Satan's secret lair. After some talk he convinced her to come with him and together with a good friend to many Kamen Riders, Tobei Tachibana they fought Black Satan as Kamen Rider Stronger and the Electro-Wave Human Tackle for quite some time. Over time, Yuriko fell in love with Shigeru, but sadly, in episode 30, she gave her life to defeat the evil Doctor Kate in order to save him from being poisoned. This would forever haunt Shigeru and push him to undergo surgery to attain the even more powerful (and dangerous) Charge Up form. Shotaro Ishinomori and Kamen Rider co-creator Toru Hirayama conceived the idea of Tackle after receiving fan letters from young girls who said they wanted a hero to pretend to be when playing Kamen Rider with other boys.
: The mentor of the previous Kamen Riders.

Black Satan
 is a terrorist organization formed by the remnants of Shocker.

Destroyed by Stronger's Stronger Electro Kick.
 : A high-ranking officer of Black Satan. He and General Shadow are rivals. He can assume a human form. He was thrown into the sea by Stronger and destroyed. However, Black Satan learns of his demise and performs a ritual that revives Titan into . He was then destroyed by Stronger's Stronger Double Kick.
 : A lionlike monster from Egypt who is known as the strongest great commander of Black Satan. He took over after Mr. Titan's death. After Black Satan's destruction, his whereabouts are unknown.
 : Black owl foot soldiers of Black Satan. Scientists wear white gowns.

General Shadow
 is a high-ranking officer who is rivals with Titan. Armed with the Shadow Sword, his trademark attack is Trump Shoot. After abandoning Black Satan, he forms the Delza Army. Destroyed by Stronger (Charge Up)'s Super Electro Lightning Kick.

Delza Army
The  is created by General Shadow after he leaves Black Satan. After its destruction, he forms the Delza Army to fight Kamen Rider Stronger. The first eight of his officers schemed against him, but never challenged General Shadow, but soon General Shadow was overthrown by Great Marshal Machine. The organization was destroyed by the combined efforts of Kamen Rider Stronger and the six previous Riders.

 : A stone giant controlled by the one-eyed brain-like Great Leader; later revealed to be the true form of the Great Leader of Shocker from the original series. He takes on the form of a giant rock, impervious to the attacks of the Riders. He then self-destructs in an attempt to kill all seven Riders.
 : The foot soldiers of the Delza Army. Each foot soldier wears a different mask depending on the one who leads them.
 : An armor monster. Destroyed by Stronger's Stronger Electro Kick.
 : An eaglelike monster. Destroyed by Stronger's Underwater Electro Fire.
 : A plumed cockscomblike monster that shoots poisonous liquid. She is destroyed by the poisoned Tackle's Ultra Cyclone.
 : A skulllike monster. Destroyed by Stronger (Charge Up)'s Super Electron Drill Kick.
 : A rocklike monster. Destroyed by Stronger (Charge Up)'s Super Electron Drill Kick (head) and Super Electro Three-step Kick (body).
 : A wolflike monster. Destroyed by Stronger (Charge Up)'s Super Electro Lightning Kick.
 : A Frankenstein's monster-inspired monster. Destroyed by Stronger (Charge Up)'s Super Electro Speed Diving Punch.
 : A snakelike monster who has the ability to suck blood and make humans who look into her eyes follow her orders. Destroyed by Stronger (Charge Up)'s Super Electro Big Wheel Kick.
 : A mummy monster from Egypt who later along with his follower Commanders Jishaku and Armored Knight overthrew General Shadow when he failed to capture Kamen Rider Stronger while Commander Jishaku and Armored Knight were able to capture Kamen Rider V3 and Riderman. Destroyed by Stronger's Electro Punch. 
 : A magnet monster who becomes one of Marshal Machine's followers and has the ability to throw magnets and make the target move to whatever direction he's aiming. He was destroyed with the revived Kaijin Corps.
 : An armor monster who becomes one of Marshal Machine's followers and has the ability to make fire from his two swords but later one of his two swords is destroyed by Kamen Rider X's Ridol with help from Kamen Rider Amazon. He was destroyed with the revived Kaijin Corps.

Special guest stars
Takeshi Hongo/Kamen Rider 1 from Kamen Rider
Hayato Ichimonji/Kamen Rider 2 from Kamen Rider
Shiro Kazami/Kamen Rider V3 from Kamen Rider V3
Joji Yuki/Riderman from Kamen Rider V3
Keisuke Jin/Kamen Rider X from Kamen Rider X
Daisuke Yamamoto/Kamen Rider Amazon from Kamen Rider Amazon

List of episodes
  (Original Airdate: April 5, 1975)
  (Original Airdate: April 12, 1975)
  (Original Airdate: April 19, 1975)
  (Original Airdate: April 26, 1975)
  (Original Airdate: May 3, 1975)
  (Original Airdate: May 10, 1975)
  (Original Airdate: May 17, 1975)
  (Original Airdate: May 24, 1975)
  (Original Airdate: May 31, 1975)
  (Original Airdate: June 7, 1975)
  (Original Airdate: June 14, 1975)
  (Original Airdate: June 21, 1975)
  (Original Airdate: June 28, 1975)
  (Original Airdate: July 5, 1975)
  (Original Airdate: July 12, 1975)
  (Original Airdate: July 19, 1975)
  (Original Airdate: July 26, 1975)
  (Original Airdate: August 2, 1975)
  (Original Airdate: August 9, 1975)
  (Original Airdate: August 16, 1975)
  (Original Airdate: August 23, 1975)
  (Original Airdate: August 30, 1975)
  (Original Airdate: September 6, 1975)
  (Original Airdate: September 13, 1975)
  (Original Airdate: September 20, 1975)
  (Original Airdate: September 27, 1975)
  (Original Airdate: October 4, 1975)
  (Original Airdate: October 11, 1975)
  (Original Airdate: October 18, 1975)
  (Original Airdate: October 25, 1975)
  (Original Airdate: November 1, 1975)
  (Original Airdate: November 8, 1975)
  (Original Airdate: November 15, 1975)
  (Original Airdate: November 22, 1975)
  (Original Airdate: November 29, 1975)
  (Original Airdate: December 6, 1975)
  (Original Airdate: December 13, 1975)
  (Original Airdate: December 20, 1975)
  (Original Airdate: December 27, 1975)

Movie
Kamen Rider Stronger
A reedited episode 7. Waniida from Black Satan attacks a young boy and long-time Kamen Rider ally Tōbei Tachibana, but Kamen Rider Stronger and Electro-Wave Human Tackle run in to make the save. However, Shigeru and Yuriko fall into separate traps and are captured by Black Satan. Yuriko fights for her life as Shigeru is brainwashed by the organization.

Special
The 45-minute All Together! Seven Kamen Riders!!, first broadcast on January 3, 1976 (one week after the series' finale) opens with Tobei Tachibana taking some children to a Kamen Rider roadshow. Just as he's reminiscing about all the heroic modified humans he's lived alongside: 1, 2, V3, Riderman, X, Amazon, Stronger and Tackle, the first seven Riders gradually show up to greet him in their human guises, unrecognized by the crowds. When it's revealed that the monsters onstage are real and not actors, the Riders transform to save the crowd and Rider actors, uniting their power to defeat the Delza Army's true leader,  in his hideout beneath the stadium.

Cast
Shigeru Araki as Shigeru Jō/Kamen Rider Stronger
Kyōko Okada as Yuriko Misaki
Akiji Kobayashi as Tōbei Tachibana
Hiroshi Ogasawara as Yōichirō Masaki
Akira Hamada as Titan
Mahito Tsujimura as Dead Lion (voice)
Gorō Naya as The Great Leader of Black Satan, The Great Leader of Delza Army, Great Leader Rock (voice)
Hidekatsu Shibata as General Shadow (voice)
Osamu Ichikawa as Marshal Machine (voice)
Shinji Nakae as Narrator

Songs
Opening theme

Lyrics: Saburō Yatsude
Composition: Shunsuke Kikuchi
Artist: Ichirou Mizuki

Ending theme

Lyrics: Saburō Yatsude
Composition: Shunsuke Kikuchi
Artists: Masato Shimon & Mitsuko Horie (episodes 1 & 2), Ichirou Mizuki & Mitsuko Horie (episodes 3-31)
Episodes: 1-31

Lyrics: Shotaro Ishinomori
Composition: Shunsuke Kikuchi
Artists: Ichirou Mizuki & Mitsuko Horie
Episodes 32-39

Notes

See also

Stronger
1975 Japanese television series debuts
1975 Japanese television series endings
Mainichi Broadcasting System original programming
1970s Japanese television series
Japanese horror fiction television series